Blenina accipiens is a moth of the family Nolidae first described by Francis Walker in 1858. It is found in India, Sri Lanka, Myanmar and Australia.

Description
The wingspan of the male is 36 mm. It is similar to Blenina donans. It differs in having a brownish thorax. Forewings with fuscous brown suffusion. Hindwings with brownish basal half suffusion. Outer band more irregular.

References

Moths of Asia
Moths described in 1858
Nolidae